Netflix is an American global on-demand Internet streaming media provider, that has distributed a number of original programs, including original series, specials, miniseries, documentaries and films. Netflix's original films also include content that was first screened on cinematic release in other countries or given exclusive broadcast in other territories, and is then described as Netflix original content.

Feature films

Documentaries

Specials
These programs are one-time original events or supplementary content related to original films.

Notes

References

External links
 Netflix Originals current list on Netflix (based on geolocation)

2020